IPTS may refer to:

 Institute for Prospective Technological Studies, in Seville, Spain
 International Practical Temperature Scale, predecessors to the International Temperature Scale of 1990
 Plural or possessive of IPT